The State Register of Heritage Places is maintained by the Heritage Council of Western Australia. , 134 places are heritage-listed in the Shire of Murray, of which 13 are on the State Register of Heritage Places.

List
The Western Australian State Register of Heritage Places, lists the following 13 state registered places within the Shire of Murray:

See also
 Australian residential architectural styles
 Australian non-residential architectural styles

References

Murray
 
Murray